HMS Penelope was a  of the Royal Navy. In the Falklands War, Penelope fired on an Argentine patrol boat and claimed to be the last ship attacked by Argentine aircraft over the course of the war.
In 1991, she was commissioned into the Ecuadorean Navy, and renamed Presidente Eloy Alfaro.

Background
The ship that eventually became HMS Penelope was originally intended as a Type 61 aircraft direction frigate to have been named HMS Coventry, as part of a second batch of Type 61s. However, under the 1957 Defence White Paper, the order for Coventry was deferred. the plan for a new batch of four Type 61s, including Coventry, was eventually cancelled in 1961. However, the intended hull was subsequently ordered as a unit of the new Leander-class, and was named as HMS Penelope. Like other ships of the class, Penelope was named after a figure of mythology.

Construction
Penelope was laid down at Vickers-Armstrongs' Walker shipyard on Tyneside on 14 March 1961, was launched on 17 August 1962. Penelope was commissioned on 31 October 1963 with the Pennant number F127. Total construction cost was £4,600,000.

Displacement was  standard and  full load.

A twin 4.5-inch (113 mm) Mark 6 gun mount was fitted forward. While the Leander-class was planned to be fitted with the Sea Cat surface-to-air missile, Penelope was completed with two Bofors 40 mm anti-aircraft guns as a temporary substitute until Sea Cat could be fitted. A Limbo anti-submarine mortar was fitted aft to provide a short-range anti-submarine capability, while a hangar and helicopter deck allowed a single Westland Wasp helicopter to be operated, for longer range anti-submarine and anti-surface operations.

As built, Penelope was fitted with a large Type 965 long range air search radar on the ship's mainmast, with a Type 993 short range air/surface target indicating radar and Type 974 navigation radar carried on the ship's foremast. An MRS3 fire control system was carried to direct the 4.5-inch guns. The ship had a sonar suite of Type 177 medium range search sonar, Type 162 bottom search and Type 170 attack sonar, together with a Type 199 variable depth sonar (VDS).

Operational history

1963-1967
After commissioning and workup, Penelope joined the 20th Frigate Squadron which was based at Londonderry Port in Northern Ireland, and from September–December 1964, formed part of a special squadron led by the cruiser  that visited South American ports in an effort to improve relations and increase trade between Britain and South America. The ship transferred to the 2nd Frigate Squadron in September 1965. In 1966 Penelope underwent a refit into a trials ship with much of her weaponry and sensors removed or deactivated. The large Type 965 radar was removed, as was the ship's VDS gear and 40 mm guns, while the twin 4.5-in gun turret and fire-control system was cocooned for preservation. She was also fitted with a prototype Type 184M sonar.

1968
In 1968, Penelope assisted in the aftermath of the Aer Lingus Flight 712 crash in the Irish Sea. There have been a number of conspiracy theories about the crash, including the alleged involvement of Penelope. The theory goes that the ship, while performing tests, mistook the aircraft for a target drone and shot her down.

1969-1981
The following year, Penelope was present in West Germany during the Kiel Week festival which combined a yachting race and festival events. In 1971, she underwent another refit to allow her to carry out trials on the Sea Wolf missile. All existing armament was removed, and an experimental tracking system and then a Sea Wolf launcher were mounted on the ship's flight deck. The location of individual trials was dictated by the needs of the scientists conducting the trials. Sometimes live fire trials were conducted within a firing range off the Welsh coast. 4.5 inch shells fired from a ship several miles away would pass overhead and be targeted by Sea Wolf. Most trials however were conducted in harbour, tied up alongside, with the boilers shut down. These trials continued until December 1977, when she started another refit at Devonport Dockyard to return her to an operational frigate and convert her to Batch 2 Exocet configuration.

Falklands War
In 1982, Penelope took part in the Falklands War as part of the "Bristol group", which included two other Leander-class ships -  and  - she did not reach the Falkland Islands area of operations until 26 May. Upon her arrival, Penelope recovered air-dropped stores. Thereafter she escorted ships to and from the beachhead at San Carlos and Bluff Cove, including, in late May, the damaged  which had suffered damage after being hit by cannon fire and bombs.

On 13 June, Penelopes Lynx helicopter struck the already stranded Argentinian patrol boat Rio Iguazu with a Sea Skua missile. Penelope also claimed to be the last ship attacked by Argentine aircraft over the course of the war. Penelope returned home in September 1982.

Soon after, Penelope undertook a Falklands patrol in the tense aftermath of the war, and did not return home until June 1983. The following year, she deployed to the South Atlantic again, patrolling and performing other duties in that region.

1988
On 12 September 1988,  and collided with the starboard side of the Canadian Naval supply ship  {{cnspan|during a replenishment. Penelope caught the Preserver'''s starboard anchor, cutting her port side open. The Canadian vessel suffered $260,000 damage, while Penelope suffered damage estimated in the millions|date=November 2020}}

She was renamed Presidente Eloy Alfaro after President Eloy Alfaro, a prominent Ecuadorean martyred reformer of the early 20th century.Presidente Eloy Alfaro was decommissioned on 19 March 2008, after 17 years in the Ecuadorean Navy.

References

Publications
 
 
 Marriott, Leo, 1983.  Royal Navy Frigates 1945-1983'', Ian Allan Ltd.  
 

 

Leander-class frigates
Falklands War naval ships of the United Kingdom
1962 ships
Leander-class frigates of the Ecuadorian Navy